{{Automatic taxobox
|image = 
|image_caption =
|taxon = Pseudotanais
|authority = Sars, 1882
|synonyms = 
 Pontotanais Bacescu, 1960
 Pseudotanais (Pseudotanais) Sars, 1882
}}Pseudotanais is a genus of tanaidacean crustacean.

 Species 
According to the World Register of Marine Species, the following species are accepted within Paratanaoidea:

 Pseudotanais abathogaster Błażewicz-Paszkowycz, Bamber & Jóźwiak, 2013
 Pseudotanais affinis Hansen, 1887
 Pseudotanais amundseni Błażewicz, Jakiel, Bamber & Bird, 2021
 Pseudotanais artoo Błażewicz-Paszkowycz & Stępień, 2015
 Pseudotanais baresnauti Bird, 1999
 Pseudotanais barnesi Błażewicz, Jakiel, Bamber & Bird, 2021
 Pseudotanais biopearli Błażewicz, Jakiel, Bamber & Bird, 2021
 Pseudotanais borceai Bacescu, 1960
 Pseudotanais californiensis Dojiri & Sieg, 1997
 Pseudotanais chaplini Jakiel, Palero & Błażewicz, 2019
 Pseudotanais chopini Jakiel, Palero & Błażewicz, 2019
 Pseudotanais colonus Bird & Holdich, 1989
 Pseudotanais corollatus Bird & Holdich, 1989
 Pseudotanais crassicornis Hansen, 1887
 Pseudotanais curieae Jakiel, Palero & Błażewicz, 2020
 Pseudotanais denticulatus Bird & Holdich, 1989
 Pseudotanais discoveryae Błażewicz, Jakiel, Bamber & Bird, 2021
 Pseudotanais elephas Błażewicz, Jakiel, Bamber & Bird, 2021
 Pseudotanais enduranceae Błażewicz, Jakiel, Bamber & Bird, 2021
 Pseudotanais falcicula Bird & Holdich, 1989
 Pseudotanais falcifer Blazewicz-Paszkowycz & Bamber, 2011
 Pseudotanais forcipatus (Lilljeborg, 1864)
 Pseudotanais forcipatus Vanhöffen, 1907
 Pseudotanais gaiae Jakiel, Palero & Błażewicz, 2019
 Pseudotanais georgesandae Jakiel, Palero & Błażewicz, 2019
 Pseudotanais geralti Jakiel, Palero & Błażewicz, 2019
 Pseudotanais inflatus Kudinova-Pasternak, 1973
 Pseudotanais intortus Błażewicz-Paszkowycz, Bamber & Jóźwiak, 2013
 Pseudotanais isabelae García-Herrero, Sánchez, García-Gómez, Pardos & Martínez, 2017
 Pseudotanais jonesi Sieg, 1977
 Pseudotanais julietae Jakiel, Palero & Błażewicz, 2019
 Pseudotanais kitsoni Błażewicz, Jakiel, Bamber & Bird, 2021
 Pseudotanais kobro Jakiel, Palero & Błażewicz, 2019
 Pseudotanais kurchatovi Kudinova-Pasternak & Pasternak, 1978
 Pseudotanais lilljeborgii Sars, 1882
 Pseudotanais livingstoni Błażewicz, Jakiel, Bamber & Bird, 2021
 Pseudotanais locueloae Jakiel, Palero & Błażewicz, 2020
 Pseudotanais longisetosus Sieg, 1977
 Pseudotanais longispinus Bird & Holdich, 1989
 Pseudotanais macrocheles Sars, 1882
 Pseudotanais mariae Jakiel, Palero & Błażewicz, 2019
 Pseudotanais mediterraneus Sars, 1882
 Pseudotanais mexikolpos Sieg & Heard, 1988
 Pseudotanais misericorde Jakiel, Stępień & Błażewicz, 2018
 Pseudotanais monroeae Jakiel, Palero & Błażewicz, 2020
 Pseudotanais nipponicus McLelland, 2007
 Pseudotanais nordenskioldi Sieg, 1977
 Pseudotanais oculatus Hansen, 1913
 Pseudotanais oloughlini Jakiel, Palero & Błażewicz, 2019
 Pseudotanais palmeri Błażewicz, Jakiel, Bamber & Bird, 2021
 Pseudotanais rapunzelae Błażewicz, Jakiel, Bamber & Bird, 2021
 Pseudotanais romeo Jakiel, Palero & Błażewicz, 2019
 Pseudotanais scalpellum Bird & Holdich, 1989
 Pseudotanais scotti Błażewicz, Jakiel, Bamber & Bird, 2021
 Pseudotanais shackletoni Błażewicz, Jakiel, Bamber & Bird, 2021
 Pseudotanais sigrunis Jakiel, Stępień & Błażewicz, 2018
 Pseudotanais soja Błażewicz-Paszkowycz, Bamber & Jóźwiak, 2013
 Pseudotanais spatula Bird & Holdich, 1989
 Pseudotanais spicatus Bird & Holdich, 1989
 Pseudotanais stiletto Bamber, 2009
 Pseudotanais svavarssoni Jakiel, Stępień & Błażewicz, 2018
 Pseudotanais szymborskae Jakiel, Palero & Błażewicz, 2020
 Pseudotanais tympanobaculum Blazewicz-Paszkowycz, Bamber & Cunha, 2011
 Pseudotanais unicus Sieg, 1977
 Pseudotanais uranos Jakiel, Palero & Błażewicz, 2019
 Pseudotanais vitjazi Kudinova-Pasternak, 1966
 Pseudotanais vulsella Bird & Holdich, 1989
 Pseudotanais yenneferae'' Jakiel, Palero & Błażewicz, 2019

References

Tanaidacea
Crustaceans of the Atlantic Ocean
Crustaceans described in 1882